Cycling is one of seven optional sports that were included in the 2014 Commonwealth Games in Glasgow. Cycling has appeared consistently since their first appearance at the 1934 British Empire Games in London with track and road events at every Games since and mountain biking being included from 2002.

The track cycling events were hosted at the newly built Sir Chris Hoy Velodrome in Glasgow's East End, whilst the mountain bike competitions utilised the purpose-built Cathkin Braes Mountain Bike Trails. The road race and time trial events took place on public road circuits in Glasgow City Centre and North Lanarkshire respectively, with both starting and finishing at Glasgow Green.

Medal summary

Medal table

Road

Mountain bike

Track

Para-track

Schedule
All times are British Summer Time (UTC+1). All event times are subject to change.

References

External links
Official results book – Cycling (Mountain Bike)
Official results book – Cycling (Road)
Official results book – Cycling (Track)

 
2014
2014 Commonwealth Games events
Commonwealth Games
2014 Commonwealth Games
2014 in road cycling
2014 in track cycling
2014 in mountain biking
International cycle races hosted by Scotland
Commonwealth Games, 2014
Glasgow Green